Pat or Patrick MacDonald may refer to:

 Pat MacDonald (gridiron football) (born 1982), Canadian-born football player
 Pat MacDonald (musician) (born 1952), American musician and songwriter for the band Timbuk3

See also
Pat McDonald (disambiguation)